Babak Masoumi (13 July 1972 – 10 August 2011) was an Iranian professional futsal player and coach who was former captain of the Iranian national team.

Career 
Masoumi began his career playing football for Fath. He then changed codes and began to play futsal, where he played for Fath Tehran, PAS Tehran and Tam Iran Khodro.

Despite suffering from cancer, Masoumi was head coach of Persepolis futsal team in the 2008–09 season and a few weeks afterwards was appointed as technical manager of Steel Azin futsal team. He was head coach of Dabiri at the time of his death.

Death 
On August 10, 2011, Masoumi died from blood cancer from which he had been suffering since 2008. Despite this, Masoumi believed beforehand that he was cured of the disease.

Masoumi had struggled to pay for his medical care and in November 2008, an exhibition game was played between Esteghlal and a Selection of Karaj team in order to raise money for the medical treatment of Masoumi and Mohammad Parsa. In addition to this Iranian football star Ali Karimi paid for Masoumi's medical bills. His body was buried on August 12, 2011, in Karaj.

Honours

Country 
 AFC Futsal Championship
 Champions (5):

Club

Individual 
 Best Asian Futsal Player of the Year, 2003

References 

9. ^ Cách điều trị xuất tinh sớm

External links 
 
 

1972 births
2011 deaths
People from Tehran
Iranian footballers
Iranian men's futsal players
Deaths from blood cancer
Deaths from cancer in Iran
Pas players
Esteghlal FSC players
Shahid Mansouri FSC players
Tam Iran Khodro FSC players
Iranian futsal coaches
Persepolis FSC managers
Association football forwards